The knockout stage was the second and final stage of the 2016 AFF Championship, following the group stage. It was played from 3 to 17 December with the top two teams from each group (two in total) advanced to the knockout stage to compete in a single-elimination tournament. Each tie was played on a home-and-away two-legged basis. The away goals rule, extra time (away goals do not apply in extra time) and penalty shoot-out were used to decide the winner if necessary.

Thailand won 3–2 on aggregate against Indonesia in the final to win their fifth title.

Qualified teams 
The top two placed teams from each of the two groups advanced to the knockout stage. In Group A, Thailand secured the group's top spot with 9 points after defeating hosts Philippines 1–0 in their last match while Indonesia became the group's runners-up with 4 points after beating Singapore 2–1. Meanwhile, in Group B, Vietnam secured the top spot with 9 points after defeating Cambodia 2–1 in their last match while hosts Myanmar became the group's runners-up with 6 points after defeating Malaysia 1–0.

Schedule 
The schedule of each round was as follows.

Bracket 

Scores after extra time are indicated by (a.e.t.), and penalty shoot-out are indicated by (pen.).

Semi-finals 

|-

|-

|}

First leg

Indonesia vs Vietnam

Myanmar vs Thailand

Second leg

Vietnam vs Indonesia

Thailand vs Myanmar

Final 

|-

|}

First leg: Indonesia vs Thailand

Second leg: Thailand vs Indonesia

References

External links 
 AFF Suzuki Cup 2016 – Official website

Knockout stage